Edmund, 2nd Earl of Kent (c. 1326 – 5 October 1331) was a member of the English royal family.

Life
He inherited the Earldom of Kent in 1331, a year after his father, Edmund of Woodstock, 1st Earl of Kent, was attainted. His mother was Margaret Wake, 3rd Baroness Wake of Liddell. 
In 1330 he was, on the petition of his mother and the reversal of his father's condemnation, recognised as Earl of Kent. He died very soon after, aged just 5, and was succeeded by his 1 year old brother, John, 3rd Earl of Kent. He in turn died aged 22, and the Earldom of Kent was held in abeyance by their sister, Joan of Kent. In a separate creation of the Earldom of Kent, her  first husband was created Earl of Kent.

Ancestry

Notes

References

1326 births
1331 deaths
Edmund
Earls of Kent (1321 creation)
Royalty and nobility who died as children